Here Comes EP is an EP from the album Up from Below by Edward Sharpe and the Magnetic Zeros.

Track listings

2009 debut EPs
Edward Sharpe and the Magnetic Zeros albums